The Samsung Galaxy J1 Nxt (also called J1 mini) is an Android powered smartphone developed by Samsung Electronics and was released in February 2016.

Specifications

Hardware 
The J1 Nxt has a Spreadtrum SC9830 SoC consisting of a quad-core 1.2 GHz ARM Cortex-A7 CPU and a Mali-400MP2 GPU. It has either 768 MB (J1 mini) or 1GB (J1 Nxt) of RAM and 8 GB of internal storage. A microSD card can be inserted for up to an additional 128GB. The rear camera's resolution is 5 MP and has an LED flashlight. The video resolution is 720p at 30fps.

Software 
The J1 Nxt is shipped with Android 5.1.1 "Lollipop" and Samsung's TouchWiz user interface.

See also 
 Samsung Galaxy
 Samsung Galaxy J series

References 

Samsung Galaxy
Mobile phones introduced in 2016
Android (operating system) devices
Samsung mobile phones
Mobile phones with user-replaceable battery